Retreat railway station was on the Ballymena, Cushendall and Red Bay Railway which ran from Ballymena to Retreat in County Antrim, Northern Ireland.

History

The station was on the Ballymena, Cushendall and Red Bay Railway route and opened by that company in October 1876 for goods traffic only.

The station was only ever for freight loading, and was never open to passenger services.

References 

 
 
 

Disused railway stations in County Antrim
Railway stations opened in 1875
Railway stations closed in 1940
Railway stations in Northern Ireland opened in the 19th century